The 2008–09 Nebraska Cornhuskers women's basketball team represented the University of Nebraska in the 2008–09 NCAA Division I women's basketball season. The Cornhuskers were coached by Connie Yori. The Cornhuskers are a member of the Big 12 Conference and did not qualify for the NCAA tournament. Those hopes were tempered with the loss of two-time first-team All-Big 12 forward Kelsey Griffin to a season-ending ankle injury in late-August. Despite playing without Griffin, the Huskers fought their way to a 9-3 record early in the season that included a dramatic come-from-behind win over No. 24 Arizona State on Dec. 28. Nebraska, which had received votes in the USA Today/ESPN Coaches Top 25 for five weeks, knocked off a Sun Devil squad that went on to advance to the 2009 NCAA Elite Eight. However, just days after defeating ASU, the Huskers took another hit inside with the loss of junior center Nikki Bober to a season-ending knee injury. Without two of their most experienced post players for a final non-conference game at five-time NCAA Final Four participant LSU, the Huskers closed non-conference play at 9-4 with all four setbacks coming to 2008 NCAA Tournament teams, including three on the road.

Roster

Schedule

Exhibitions

Regular season
The Huskers participated in the Holiday Inn & Suites Express Midtown Thanksgiving Tournament from November 28–29.

Postseason

Big 12 Tournament
March 12: Kansas 61, Nebraska 56

National Invitation Tournament
March 25: New Mexico 54, Nebraska 43

Player stats

Highlights

Team
School-record sixth consecutive postseason tournament appearance
One of five Big 12 Conference teams to post winning record in second half of Big 12 season
One of nine Big 12 Conference teams to advance to postseason
Top 25 Strength of Schedule according to CollegeRPI.com
One of 16 postseason teams honored by NCAA for Academic Progress Rate (APR)

Individual
Kaitlyn Burke scored in double figures three times during the season. She had a season-high 13 points on 6-of-11 shooting from the field versus Missouri on Jan. 17. She opened the season with 12 points, three rebounds, four assists and a career-high three steals in a win over Weber State in her first career start on Nov. 14. The last double digit game was on Dec. 28 against the Arizona State Sun Devils. She scored 12 points, three rebounds and a career-high matching three. Her career high in assists was set in the Huskers win over Long Beach State on Dec. 12.
Cory Montgomery averaged 15.2 points and 7.8 rebounds per game. She ranked among the top-eight scorers and rebounders in the league in 2008-09. In sixteen Big 12 regular-season games, she averaged 16.2 points and 7.8 boards per game. In the final seven games of the year, Montgomery averaged 19.6 points and 9.0 rebounds per game.
On January 10, All-American Courtney Paris led the Sooners with her 106th consecutive double-double, finishing with 18 points and 20 rebounds, including 10 points and 15 boards in the first half.
Freshman Harleen Sidhu opened the season with four points, five rebounds, a blocked shot and a steal in NU's season-opening win over Weber State on Nov. 14.
Yvonne Turner, led the Huskers with 67 steals on the season, which ranked among the top five players in the Big 12. She was also named to the Big 12 All-Defensive Team for the second straight season. Offensively, Turner ranked second on the team in scoring with 11.7 points per game.

Awards and honors
Eight Nebraska women's basketball players claimed spots on the Big 12 Commissioner's Spring Academic Honor Roll. Nikki Bober, Kala Kuhlmann and Harleen Sidhu posted perfect 4.0 GPAs. Bober, Kuhlmann and Sidhu were joined on the spring honor roll by teammates Kaitlyn Burke, Kelsey Griffin, Cory Montgomery, Nicole Neals and Jessica Periago.
Nikki Bober, Big 12 Commissioner's Spring Honor Roll
Kaitlyn Burke, Big 12 Commissioner's Spring Honor Roll
Kaitlyn Burke, Nebraska’s Husker Award
Kelsey Griffin, Big 12 Commissioner's Spring Honor Roll
Kala Kuhlmann, Big 12 Commissioner's Spring Honor Roll
Kala Kuhlmann, Nebraska's Teammate Award
Cory Montgomery, Big 12 Commissioner's Spring Honor Roll
Cory Montgomery, honorable-mention All-Big 12 Conference selection
Cory Montgomery, Nebraska's Offensive Player of the Year
Nicole Neals, Big 12 Commissioner's Spring Honor Roll
Jessica Periago, Big 12 Commissioner's Spring Honor Roll
Harleen Sidhu, Two-Time Big 12 Commissioner's Honor Roll (Fall 2008, Spring 2009)
Yvonne Turner, All Big-12 Honors
Yvonne Turner, Big 12 All-Defensive Team (second straight season)
Yvonne Turner, Nebraska's Defensive Player of the Year (Second straight season)

Team players drafted into the WNBA
No one from the Huskers was selected in the 2009 WNBA Draft.

References

Nebraska Cornhuskers women's basketball seasons
Nebraska
Cornhusk
Cornhusk